Wang Xinyu and You Xiaodi were the defending champions, but Wang chose to compete at the 2019 US Open instead. You partnered alongside Chihiro Muramatsu, but lost in the first round to Eudice Chong and Aldila Sutjiadi.

Yuan Yue and Zheng Wushuang won the title, defeating Samantha Murray and Eden Silva in the final, 1–6, 6–4, [10–7].

Seeds

Draw

Draw

References

External Links
Main Draw

Jinan International Open - Doubles